Southeast Missourian Building is a historic commercial building located at Cape Girardeau, Missouri.  It built in 1924–1925, and is a two-story, white stucco and red brick Mission Revival style building.  It is a steel reinforced concrete building on a concrete foundation with a full basement and measures approximately 162 feet by 160 feet.  The building houses the offices of the Southeast Missourian newspaper.

It was listed on the National Register of Historic Places in 2005.

References

Commercial buildings on the National Register of Historic Places in Missouri
Mission Revival architecture in Missouri
Commercial buildings completed in 1925
Buildings and structures in Cape Girardeau County, Missouri
National Register of Historic Places in Cape Girardeau County, Missouri
1925 establishments in Missouri